The following is a list of various titles associated with religion, politics, nobility, or the military, as used by various Iranian peoples and dynasties.

By dynasty

Median

Military
Taxmaspada (Spada) army
Asabari literally meaning "horse bearers", cavalry
Anuvaniya archers
Rsika spearmen
Pasti infantry

Achaemenid

Military
Anusiya companions, believed to be the word of which the Persian Immortals is derived
Kara literally meaning "peoples army", designation applied to the early armies of Cyrus the Great
Navpati/naupati Naval commander
Sparabara Literally meaning shield (spara) bearer

Political
Khshathrapāvā governor
Databdara Administrator of the courts, literally meaning "law bearer", who may have been a combination of the modern-day judge, law officer, or constable

Religious
Saoshyant Zoroastrian notion, similar to "Messiah"

Sassanian

Military
Vuzurg framadhār Great commander; managed the affairs of state
Aspbad Commander of the Savaran
Sardar Savaran
Arzbad-e-Aspwaragan Chief instructor of the Savaran
Spahbed Army general who could also be a military governor
Marzban Province governor, and the same role as a spahbed or strictly an army general in the province
Padgospan Assistant of the spahbad
Padan Spahbed's officers
Framandar Battle field commanders
Paygospan Provincial military commanders
Arteshtaran-salar Chief of Warriors, a term reserved for warriors displaying great bravery in battle

Political
Eran-Spahbad Minister of Defense and commander in chief of the army
Andarzbad Counsel to the king
Kanarange (Eastern Iranian term) The title given to a marzban of Central Asia
Istandar Leader of an istan (a province or district area within a province)
Argbadh Highest military title and was held by royal family members
Rasnan A less defined title
Artabid Title for Azadan families who were entrusted with specific duties, such as crowning each new monarch
Karrogbadh Chief of imperial workers; a rather unimportant position mostly delegated to Christians, especially during the reign of Khosrau II.
Vastrioshan Salar Minister of agriculture, commerce and industries.
Vuzurgan Grand nobles, who would be present at coronation ceremonies

Religious
Hirbad or Hirbod/Herbed; Protector and caretaker of fire temple, Zoroastrian judge and arbiter.
Mogh Zoroastrian Magi (plural: Moghan)
Mobad or Mowbed; High-ranking Priest (moghpati, moghbadh; plural: Mobadan)
Mobadan Mobad or Mowbedan Mowbed; Chief of the clergy

Safavid

Dah-bashi Commander of 10 soldiers (lit. head of 10)
Yuz-bashi Commander of 100 soldiers
Amir Tuman Commander of 1000 soldiers

Qajar

Political
Malekeh Queen
Malekeh Jahaan World Queen, title shared by Nasser-ed-Din Shah's mother and Mohammad 'Ali Shah's wife.
Mahd-e-Oliaa "Queen Mother" (Lit. Mahd = hearth or cradle; Olia' = most high; thus = "most high hearth or cradle" or "most high life giving place" ; i.e., place from whence one is born, and thus more elegantly translated as "Sublime Cradle." Hence the title bearer is the mother of the next Shah), associated with some Qajar (Kadjar) queens, especially Fath Ali Shah's mother and Nasser-ed-Din Shah's mother.
A'laa Hazrat "Your Most High Majesty" in reference to the king. Appellation of Persian/Iranian kings.
Oliaa' Hazrat Literally meaning "Your Most High Majesty" in reference to the Queen. Title specifically created for Malekeh Jahan.
Khan Leader, usually of a tribe
Shahzadeh Prince, used specifically to refer to Qajar princes

By people

Kurds
Peshmerga the term used by Kurds to refer to armed Kurdish fighters.

Imperial and Royal titles

Shahanshah Emperor (lit. "King of Kings")
Shah King
Keyaksar (Cyaxares) The one high King
Padishah Great King
Shahzadeh Prince (lit. "born of a king" i.e., "of kingly birth or parentage")
Arranshah King of Arran
Layzanshah King of Layzan
Shirvanshah King of Shirvan (see also: Shirvanshahs)

References

Society of Iran
Iranian military-related lists